Peritrichocera is a moth genus in the family Carposinidae.

Species
Peritrichocera barboniella 
Peritrichocera bipectinata Diakonoff, 1961
Peritrichocera bougreauella 
Peritrichocera tsilaosa Viette, 1995

References

Diakonoff, A. 1961a. Records and descriptions of exotic Tortricoidea (Lep.). - Ann. Sté entom. France 130:49–76, pl. 1.
Natural History Museum Lepidoptera generic names catalog

Carposinidae